The Tophane Agreement was a treaty between the Principality of Bulgaria and the Ottoman Empire signed on  during an ambassadorial conference in Istanbul. The agreement was named after the Istanbul neighborhood Tophane, located in Beyoğlu district, where the treaty was signed.

Signed by the Ottoman Grand Vizier Mehmed Kamil Pasha and the Bulgarian foreign minister Iliya Tsanov, as well the ambassadors of the Great Powers, the agreement recognized the Prince of Bulgaria (Alexander of Battenberg at the time) as Governor-General of the autonomous Ottoman Province Eastern Rumelia.

As compensation, the Ottoman Empire received the area around Kardzhali, as well as the Republic of Tamrash, for a total area of 1,640 km². With this treaty, the territory of the unified Bulgaria became 94,345 km². Bulgaria later regained the lands lost in this treaty following victory in the First Balkan War (1912–13).

References 

Bilateral treaties of the Ottoman Empire
1886 treaties
1886 in Bulgaria
Treaties of the Principality of Bulgaria
19th century in Istanbul
1886 in the Ottoman Empire
April 1886 events